Bread and Circuses is the third studio album by The View. It was recorded with producer Youth in 2010. In late 2010, the band went on an expansive tour of the UK in support of the album.

Track listing
 "Grace"
 "Underneath The Lights"
 "Tragic Magic"
 "Girl"
 "Life"
 "Friend"
 "Beautiful"
 "Blondie"
 "Sunday"
 "Walls"
 "Happy"
 "Best Lasts Forever"
 "Witches"

Reception
Reviews of Bread and Circuses were mixed. It entered the UK Album Charts at #14. First single "Sunday" was released as a free download in November 2010 and second single "Grace" was released one week before the album in March 2011, with the previously unreleased B-side "Clowns". "Grace" was inspired by guitarist Pete Reilly's downstairs neighbour and their noise complaints against him.
The single failed to chart inside the UK top 100.

Chart performance

References

2011 albums
The View (band) albums